Pumas FC. is a Puerto Rican soccer team who plays in Guayanilla.  The team plays in the Puerto Rico Soccer League 2nd Division.  They also play in the Liga Nacional.

2008 season
The team finished the season with a record of 6–1–1.  Their only loss was a 3–1 defeat to Yabucoa Borikén.

Liga Nacional
The team lost their first game 6–3 to Club Yaguez.

Current squad

References

Puerto Rico Soccer League 2nd Division
Liga Nacional de Fútbol de Puerto Rico teams